Teodor Brateş was a Romanian radio (1949–1958) and television journalist (1960–1990). He received a Ph.D. in Economics. Brateş was the assistant chief editor of the Romanian Public Television News Department during the last years of Nicolae Ceauşescu's regime.

He is mostly remembered today for his role in the Romanian Revolution, when he was on air for almost 70 hours during the 22nd, 23rd and 24 December 1989. He was also the one who announced Ceaușescu's arrest on the 25th of December.

Works 
Teodor Brateş, Explozia unei clipe. O zi in studioul 4 (English: "The Explosion of Moments, a Day in Studio 4"), 22 December 1989 (Bucuresti, Scripta, 1992); Trilogia Revoluţiei Române în Direct (English: Trilogy of the Romanian Revolution), 3 volumes, 1500 pg., ed. Ager-Economistul, 2004.

References

External links
Romanian Television

Romanian journalists